Maud Edith Eleanor Watson, MBE (9 October 1864 – 5 June 1946) was a British tennis player and the first female Wimbledon champion.

Biography
Born in Harrow, Middlesex, the daughter of a local vicar Henry William and Emily Frances Watson. She learned to play tennis in the garden with her sister and did not find it difficult because she had already played squash racquets. At the age of sixteen Watson played her first match at the Edgbaston Cricket and Lawn Tennis Club. It was a successful debut, winning the singles competition by defeating her sister Lillian in the final and winning the doubles competition with her.

In 1884 Watson participated in the Irish Ladies' Championship and defeated the reigning Irish champion May Langrishe 6–3, 6–2, 6–2. She was also victorious in the mixed doubles tournament winning the title with multiple Wimbledon champion William Renshaw. Undefeated in tournament play, in 1884 the nineteen-year-old Watson won the first-ever Ladies' Singles title at Wimbledon. Playing in white corsets and petticoats, from a field of thirteen competitors, she defeated Lilian 6–8, 6–3, 6–3 in the final to claim the title and a silver flower basket valued at 20 guineas. 

1885 was a year of great success for Watson, who remained unbeaten in singles and lost only one set. She repeated her success at the 1885 Wimbledon championships. In a field of just 10 entries she easily won the quarter- and semi-finals and in the final defeated Blanche Bingley 6–1, 7–5. She successfully defended her title at the 1885 Irish Championships against Louise Martin. For two sets, there was little to choose between them, but in the decider, Watson outlasted her opponent to win 6–2, 4–6, 6–3. In 1886, the year the Challenge Round was introduced for women, Bingley turned the tables, defeating Watson 6–3, 6–3 in the final to take the title.

In 1887 and 1888 Watson, was handicapped by a sprained wrist, symptoms of such amplified with time. Her final competition came at the Edgbaston tournament in June 1889. She entered three events (doubles, mixed doubles and handicap singles) and won them all. While on holiday in Jersey she went swimming off the coast and nearly drowned. She was rescued with difficulty and suffered an illness afterwards which she took a number of years to recover completely from.

Maud Watson worked as a nurse during the First World War for which she was made a Member of the Order of the British Empire. 

Watson, who did not marry, died on 5 June 1946, aged 81, at Hammonds Mead House in Charmouth.

Grand Slam finals

Singles (2 titles, 1 runner-up)

References

1864 births
1946 deaths
19th-century English people
19th-century female tennis players
English female tennis players
People from Harrow, London
People from the Metropolitan Borough of Solihull
People from West Dorset District
Sportspeople from Dorset
Wimbledon champions (pre-Open Era)
Members of the Order of the British Empire
Grand Slam (tennis) champions in women's singles
Tennis people from Greater London
British people of World War I